Gulou Subdistrict is a subdistrict situated on the northeast corner of Nankai District, Tianjin, China. It borders Jieyuan and Dahongtong Subdistricts to its north, Guangfudao Subdistrict to its east, Nanshi and Xingnan Subdistricts to its south, as well as Lingdangge and Guangkai Subdistricts to its west. In 2010, its total population was 28,788.

The name Gulou is referring to a drum tower that was first constructed in the region around 1493.

Geography 
Gulou subdistrict is on western bank of Hai River and southern bank of Nanyun River.

History

Administrative divisions 
At the end of 2021, Gulou Subdistrict was subdivided 13 residential communities. They are listed as follows:

Gallery

References 

Township-level divisions of Tianjin
Nankai District, Tianjin